The Scarborough Bridge is a wooden covered bridge in the Barclay Farm neighborhood of Cherry Hill, New Jersey. It carries 2 lanes of Covered Bridge Road, as well as 2 sidewalks for pedestrians and bicyclists. The bridge was named after Bob Scarborough, a housing developer who established the Barclay Farm neighborhood, where the bridge is located. A bridge was needed in the area to extend the subdivision street system over the North Branch, which is a small tributary of the Cooper River. The bridge was designed by Malcolm Wells and was open to traffic on February 14, 1959. The bridge was renovated in 1993. Having a town truss design, the Scarborough Bridge is considered a historical landmark for the community.

References

External links

Throwback Thursday: Scarborough Covered Bridge stands out in Cherry Hill history

Bridges completed in 1959
Bridges in Camden County, New Jersey
Cherry Hill, New Jersey
Covered bridges in New Jersey
Wooden bridges in New Jersey
Road bridges in New Jersey